Gündüzqala (also, Gyunduzkala and Gyundyuzkala) is a village and municipality in the Qusar Rayon of Azerbaijan.  It has a population of 976.  It is located between the villages of İmamqulukənd and Bədişqala on Qusar-Imamgulukery Way.

References

External links

Location at World-geographics

Populated places in Qusar District